Wacky Waters Adventure Park was a water park located in Davenport, Iowa that was in operation from 1984 to 2006. In February 2007, it was announced that Wacky Waters has closed and the property has been sold to the Eastern Iowa Community College District, which will operate The Midwest Center For Safety And Rescue Training on the property, a training facility for fire departments.

In 1986, a couple received national attention by having their marriage ceremony atop the park's "Daredevil" water slide.  After exchanging vows, they kissed each other while sliding down the large slide.

Former Attractions
Before the park closed, it featured numerous attractions including:

Bumper boats
Kids' Pirate Ship
L'il Squirt Children's Slide
Extreme Slide called the Bonsai
Two Body Slides, Daredevil & Thunderbolt
The Wave Pool
Pond with Diving Boards and Zip Lines
Go Carts
Miniature Golf

References

Buildings and structures in Davenport, Iowa
Water parks in Iowa
Defunct amusement parks in the United States